"E de fel på mig?" is a song written by Pontus Assarsson, Thomas G:son, Jörgen Ringqvist and Daniel Barkman. Performed by Linda Bengtzing in the fourth semifinal of Melodifestivalen 2011 in Malmö, it received the highest number of votes, making it to the finals inside the Stockholm Globe Arena, where it ended up seventh.

The song charted at Svensktoppen for one week on 10 April 2011, where it entered at number nine, before leaving chart the next week. It also charted on the Swedish Singles Chart at number 15.

Charts

References

Linda Bengtzing songs
Melodifestivalen songs of 2011
Songs written by Thomas G:son
Swedish-language songs
2011 songs
Songs written by Pontus Assarsson
Songs written by Jörgen Ringqvist